Shariann Lewitt (born 1954) is an American author, specializing in science fiction. She is currently a lecturer at the Massachusetts Institute of Technology.

Publications 
 First and Final Rites (1984, Ace)
 White Wing (1985, Tor) with Susan Shwartz (as Gordon Kendall)
 Angel at Apogee (1987, Ace) (as S. N. Lewitt)
 Blind Justice (1991, Ace) (as S. N. Lewitt)
 Cybernetic Jungle (1992, Ace) (as S. N. Lewitt)
 Songs of Chaos (1993, Ace) (as S. N. Lewitt)
 Memento Mori (1995, Tor)
 Interface Masque (1997, Tor)
 Rebel Sutra (2000, Tor)

U.S.S.A.
 U.S.S.A. Book 2 (1987, Avon) (as S. N. Lewitt)
 U.S.S.A. Book 4 (1987, Avon) (as S. N. Lewitt)

Cyberstealth
 Cyberstealth (1989, Ace) (as S. N. Lewitt)
 Dancing Vac (1990, Ace) (as S. N. Lewitt)

Star Trek: Voyager
 Cybersong (1996) (as S. N. Lewitt)

Succubus In The City
 Succubus in the City (2008, Del Rey) (as Nina Harper)
 Succubus Takes Manhattan (2008, Del Rey) (as Nina Harper)

External links

 Readercon bio: http://www.readercon.org/bios/lewitt.htm

20th-century American novelists
21st-century American novelists
American science fiction writers
American women short story writers
American women novelists
1954 births
Living people
Massachusetts Institute of Technology faculty
Women science fiction and fantasy writers
20th-century American women writers
21st-century American women writers
20th-century American short story writers
21st-century American short story writers
Novelists from Massachusetts
Pseudonymous women writers
American women academics
20th-century pseudonymous writers
21st-century pseudonymous writers